SM U-47  was a Type U-43  submarine of the Imperial German Navy (Kaiserliche Marine.). She engaged in commerce raiding  during the First World War.

Career
U-47 entered service in early 1916, serving initially with the III Flotilla, and from 27 December 1916 with the Pola Flotilla. Her captain between 14 January and 14 June 1918 was Wilhelm Canaris.

Engine troubles meant she could not be used from June 1918, and was finally scuttled at Pula on 28 October 1918 during the evacuation.

Summary of raiding history

References

Notes

Citations

Bibliography

U-boats commissioned in 1916
World War I submarines of Germany
U-boats scuttled in 1918
Maritime incidents in 1918
World War I shipwrecks in the Adriatic Sea
1916 ships
Ships built in Danzig
Type U 43 submarines